Sir Bradley Marc Wiggins, CBE (born 28 April 1980) is a British former professional road and track racing cyclist, who competed professionally between 2001 and 2016. He began his cycling career on the track, but later made the transition to road cycling. He won world titles in four disciplines (Madison, individual pursuit, team pursuit and road time trial), and Olympic gold in three (individual pursuit, team pursuit and road time trial). He is the only rider to have won both World and Olympic championships on both the track and the road as well as winning the Tour de France. He has worn the leader's jersey in each of the three Grand Tours of cycling and held the world record in team pursuit on multiple occasions. He won a gold medal at four successive Olympic Games from 2004 to 2016, and held the record as Great Britain's most decorated Olympian with 8 medals until Jason Kenny won his 9th in 2021. He is the only rider to win both the Tour de France and Olympic Gold in the same year, winning them a week apart in 2012.

The son of the Australian cyclist Gary Wiggins, Wiggins was born to a British mother in Ghent, Belgium, and raised in London from the age of two. He competed on the track from the early part of his career until 2008. Between 2000 and 2008 he won ten medals at the track world championships, of which six were gold: three in the individual pursuit, two in the team pursuit and one in the madison. His first Olympic medal was a bronze in the team pursuit in Sydney 2000, before winning three medals including the gold in the individual pursuit at the Athens 2004, and two golds in the individual and team pursuit at the Beijing 2008.

On the road, Wiggins turned professional in 2001 but made it his focus from 2008. Initially viewed as a time trial specialist and as a rouleur, he showed his ability in stage races when he came fourth in the 2009 Tour de France; he was later promoted to third after Lance Armstrong's results were annulled in 2012. He signed with the newly formed  in 2010, and in 2011 he claimed his first victory in a major stage race in the Critérium du Dauphiné, as well as finishing third, later promoted to second, in the Vuelta a España. In 2012, Wiggins won the Paris–Nice, the Tour de Romandie, the Critérium du Dauphiné, and became the first British cyclist to win the Tour de France and the time trial at the 2012 Summer Olympics. In 2014, he won gold in the time trial at the road world championships, and founded the  cycling team. In 2016, he won a further world championship in the madison, and gold in the team pursuit at the Olympics, his fifth successive medal winning appearance at the Games. He retired from all forms of professional cycling on 28 December 2016.

Wiggins was appointed a CBE in 2009. Following his success in 2012, Wiggins was the subject of further honours and awards: the Vélo d'Or award for best rider of the year, the BBC Sports Personality of the Year Award and a knighthood as part of the 2013 New Year Honours.

During his career and afterwards he faced a series of allegations that he exploited a loophole in cycling's anti-doping regulations to use a performance-enhancing drug, injections of the powerful corticosteroid, triamcinolone. He did not receive any bans or suspensions in relation to doping during his career.

On 5 March 2018, the British House of Commons Committee for Digital, Culture, Media and Sport published their report called "Combatting doping in sport". They concluded inter alia that Team Sky had used the powerful banned corticosteroid triamcinolone in 2012 under TUE (Therapeutic Use Exemption) "to prepare Bradley Wiggins, and possibly other riders supporting him, for the Tour de France. The purpose of this was not to treat medical need, but to improve his power to weight ratio ahead of the race." The report concluded that "we believe that drugs were being used by Team Sky, within the World Anti-Doping Agency rules, to enhance the performance of riders, and not just to treat medical need."

Early life and amateur career
Wiggins was born on 28 April 1980 in Ghent, Flanders, Belgium, to an Australian father, Gary Wiggins, and a British mother, Linda. His father lived in Belgium as a professional cyclist. His father left the family when Wiggins was two. Wiggins moved with his mother to her parents' house in Villiers Road, Willesden Green, north-west London, then to a Church Commission flat at Dibdin House estate in neighbouring Maida Vale. He was educated at St Augustine's junior school and then St Augustine's Church of England High School in Kilburn, where his mother was a secretary. He has a younger half-brother, Ryan, from his mother and her partner Brendan. Brendan and Linda separated when Wiggins was in his late teens.

Football was his first passion and he was an Arsenal fan, although he would watch rivals Tottenham Hotspur play because his friends supported them. He discovered cycling when his mother told him to watch the television coverage of the individual pursuit final of the 1992 Summer Olympics in Barcelona, which Briton Chris Boardman won. She explained it was one of the events at which his father had been successful. He watched the rest of the Olympics and fell in love with cycling and the Olympics itself.

In 1992, aged 12, he entered his first race, the West London Challenge 92, on the unopened A312 dual carriageway in Hayes, west London. Later that year he broke a collarbone in a road accident. He received £1,700 compensation for his injuries. He gave his mother £700 and used the rest to buy his first racing bicycle. "At 12", he recalled, "I told my art teacher, I'm going to be Olympic champion, I'm going to wear the yellow jersey in the Tour." He joined the Archer Road Club, where his father had been a member in the late 1970s. He raced at Herne Hill Velodrome and on the road around Crystal Palace National Sports Centre. He gained domestic sponsorship from Condor Cycles's Olympia Sport and then Team Brite. He represented Westminster in the London Youth Games as a teenager. In recognition of his early achievements, 2010 he was inducted into the London Youth Games Hall of Fame.

At 16, he won the  time trial at the 1996 junior national track championships at Saffron Lane sports centre in Leicester. Selectors invited him to train at weekends at Manchester Velodrome. After leaving school he enrolled on a BTEC foundation course in business studies, but left due to cycling commitments. At the 1997 junior national track championships he won the one-kilometre time trial,  individual pursuit, points race and scratch race. He was the only British competitor for the 1997 junior track world championships in Cape Town, coming 16th in the individual pursuit and fourth in the points race.

His breakthrough came in June 1998, winning the three-kilometre individual pursuit at the junior track world championships in Cuba, aged 18. The following week, he retained his titles at the junior national track championships in Manchester. He represented England at the Commonwealth Games in Kuala Lumpur, finishing fourth in the individual pursuit, and was a member of the team that won a silver medal in the team pursuit, his first senior medal. He became a full-time Lottery-funded athlete, with a grant of nearly £20,000 a year (equivalent to £ in ).

In 1999, he began training with the Great Britain team pursuit squad and rode the PruTour – now known as the Tour of Britain, his first stage race at that level. In October he competed in the track world championships in Berlin, coming fifth in the team pursuit, and with partner Rob Hayles, came tenth in the Madison, securing qualification for the 2000 Summer Olympics in Sydney. At the Olympics he won a bronze medal in the team pursuit, beating France in the bronze medal match, and came fourth in the Madison with Hayles. In October 2000, he took silver in the team pursuit at the track world championships in Manchester, losing to Germany in the final by under half a second.

Professional career

2001–2004: Early years
In 2001, he signed for the Linda McCartney Racing Team, a British professional road cycling team, but it disbanded after internal problems. He was briefly seen in Sigma Sport colours after the collapse of the Linda McCartney team, but then secured further lottery funding, and began racing for the British national team. In September he crashed his bike, requiring two metal pins in his right wrist. Two weeks later he went to the track world championships in Antwerp, managing seventh place in the individual pursuit and consecutive silver in the team pursuit.

He joined the French team  in 2002, relocating to Nantes, and soon became homesick, finding it a huge contrast to the British Cycling set-up. At the Commonwealth Games in Manchester he won silver medals in the individual pursuit, losing to  teammate Bradley McGee (Australia) in the final, and team pursuit, beaten by Australia, who set a new world record with a time of three minutes and 59.583 seconds. At the track world championships in Copenhagen, he came fifth in the individual pursuit and won a bronze medal in the team pursuit. British Cycling then enlisted the newly retired Chris Boardman as his mentor.

In May 2003, Wiggins made his Grand Tour debut at the Giro d'Italia. On the 18th stage he was eliminated from the race, finishing outside of the time limit in a group of 53 riders. In the summer he competed in the track world championships in Stuttgart, qualifying fastest in the individual pursuit, before beating Russia's Alexei Markov in the first round, setting up a place in the final against Australia's Luke Roberts. He beat Roberts by 0.736 seconds to win the gold medal, his first senior world title. He also came away with a silver medal in the team pursuit, beaten by Australia in the final, who broke their own world record with a time of three minutes and 57.280 seconds. In September he won stage one of the Tour de l'Avenir, beating teammate Benoît Vaugrenard and 's Joost Posthuma by 14 seconds.

He began training for the 2004 Summer Olympics in Athens, at first struggling with illness and fitness, he arrived in peak form; he qualified for the individual pursuit with a time of four minutes and 15.165 seconds, an Olympic record and fifth fastest time in history. In the final he beat McGee by over four seconds to win the gold medal. Wiggins was brought in to the team pursuit squad for the first round against France, replacing Bryan Steel, and advanced into the final, where the team were beaten by Australia, settling for the silver medal. Wiggins then partnered Rob Hayles in the Madison. With 90 laps left of the 200, Hayles crashed with Dutchman Robert Slippens, returning after a few laps. They lost a lap to their rivals, but with 30 to go Wiggins attacked, and they regained the lost lap, moving into second place. They lost points in the final sprint, moving them down to third, taking the bronze medal with 12 points, behind Switzerland on 15 and Australia on 22. Wiggins became the first British athlete in 40 years to win three medals at one Games, the last being Mary Rand at the 1964 Summer Olympics in Tokyo. On 31 December 2004 he was appointed an Officer of the Order of the British Empire (OBE) in the 2005 New Year Honours, for services to sport.

2005–2007: On the road
In early 2005, he revealed his desire to compete in road cycling, and in April won the  time trial around the town of Briey in northeastern France, on the second stage of the Circuit de Lorraine. In September he won his first race stage since 2001, stage eight of the Tour de l'Avenir; finishing with teammate Saul Raisin, with third-placed Steve Cummings coming in three minutes and 24 seconds later. Wiggins competed in the Giro d'Italia, finishing 123rd overall. He came seventh in the time trial at the road world championships in Madrid, one minute and 31 seconds down on winner Michael Rogers of Australia.

In March 2007, Wiggins returned to the track for the track world championships in Palma, Majorca, his first appearance at the championships since 2004. In the qualifying round for the individual pursuit, he set his second fastest time since his personal best at the Olympics in Athens, with a time of four minutes and 15.976 seconds; he beat Germany's Robert Bartko in the final to win the gold, catching him after 2750 m. He then went on to win gold in the team pursuit, beating Ukraine in the final. He finished in 13th place in the Madison, with Rob Hayles.

On the road he won stage one of the Four Days of Dunkirk and the prologue of the Critérium du Dauphiné Libéré, before competing in the Tour de France and finishing fourth in the prologue in London. It was seen as a tribute to British rider Tom Simpson, on the 40th anniversary of his death in the 1967 Tour de France, but was a gift to his wife on her birthday, with Wiggins only finding out about the date's significance after the race. He received the stage's combativity award, for the most aggressive rider.  withdrew from the race before stage 16 after Cristian Moreni failed a doping test. Wiggins and his teammates were interviewed by police and had their hotel rooms searched.

His season on the road ended riding for Great Britain at the road world championships in Stuttgart, coming tenth in the time trial, two minutes and ten seconds behind winner Cancellara of Switzerland; a result he was disappointed with, after hoping to finish on the podium.

In September he signed for the  – later known as  – for the 2008 season, joining compatriot Mark Cavendish, forming a partnership in the Madison. Wiggins then made his only appearance for the  – which is separate from the road team – at the Beijing round of the 2007–08 Track World Cup Classics in December, winning gold in the individual pursuit and silver in the Madison with Cavendish.

2008: Back to the track
For the 2008 season, Wiggins's focus was on the track and on the 2008 Summer Olympics in Beijing, deciding not to compete in the Tour de France. In February he travelled to the United States to train, and rode the Tour of California, coming second in the prologue, behind Cancellara.

In March Wiggins competed in the track world championships in Manchester, defending his individual pursuit title by beating Dutchman Jenning Huizenga in the final, his third world title in the discipline. He then won the team pursuit, setting a new world record of three minutes and 56.322 seconds in the final against Denmark. Wiggins was due to partner with Hayles in the Madison, but Hayles failed a routine blood test, and was subsequently banned for two weeks. Cavendish was then brought in as his replacement. At around halfway through the race they appeared to be out of contention, with their closest rivals all gaining a lap; but with 35 laps left to race, Wiggins launched an attack which helped them reach the field ten laps later, taking the lead, due to their superior points they had collected in the sprints. They held on to win the gold medal, finishing with 19 points, ahead of Germany on 13.

Wiggins then rode the Tour de Romandie and the Giro d'Italia, as preparation for the Olympics in August. At the Giro he was part of the lead-out train that helped Cavendish win two stages.

At the Olympics he began the defence of his title in the individual pursuit, qualifying with a time of four minutes and 15.031 seconds, breaking his own Olympic record from 2004. In the semi-final he beat Russia's Alexander Serov, before taking gold in the final against Hayden Roulston of New Zealand, becoming the first rider to defend an Olympic pursuit title successfully. He was a member of the team pursuit that broke the world record in the heats with a time of three minutes and 55.202 seconds. He paired with Cavendish in the Madison, and as the reigning world champions, they were favourites for the gold medal, but they only finished ninth. Cavendish felt that Wiggins had not performed to the best of his ability in the Madison.

In September Wiggins joined the American team  for the 2009 season. On 14 December he came ninth in the BBC Sports Personality of the Year Award, with 5,633 votes, and was a member of the British cycling team that won the Team of the Year Award. On 31 December he was appointed Commander of the Order of the British Empire (CBE) in the 2009 New Year Honours.

2009: Tour de France breakthrough
Wiggins switched his focus to road and moved with his family to the city of Girona in north-east Spain, where  were based. He started the season in February by helping the team win the opening team time trial of the Tour of Qatar, crossing the line first to take the leaders jersey. In March he came second to Contador in the opening time trial of Paris–Nice, before riding Milan–San Remo and then placing second in the time trial at Critérium International. In April he won the time trial on the final stage of the Three Days of De Panne, twenty seconds ahead of  rider Lieuwe Westra in second place, then had top-30 finishes in the Classics: Gent–Wevelgem and Paris–Roubaix. After finishing in 71st position in the Giro d'Italia and taking second place in the -long time trial on the final stage in Rome, he won the Beaumont Trophy, a domestic one-day race in Northumberland, using it as preparation for the Tour de France three weeks later.

Wiggins arrived at the Tour de France having lost , and was nicknamed "Twiggo", instead of the usual "Wiggo". He came third in the time trial on stage one in Monaco, 19 seconds behind 's Cancellara and one behind Contador. He then helped  to second in stage four's team time trial, despite losing four riders. On stage seven he finished 12th in the first mountain finish and was in fifth place overall at the beginning of the second week. On stage fifteen in Verbier – the second mountain finish, Wiggins finished fifth, rising to third place overall. Wiggins failed to gain time on the descent and finished three minutes and seven seconds down on winner Fränk Schleck, dropping to sixth overall.

Wiggins moved back up to fourth, after finishing in second place in the time trial on stage 19, finishing in sixth place 42 seconds down on winner Contador. On stage 20 to Mont Ventoux, Wiggins was dropped by the yellow jersey group  from the summit, finishing in tenth place and kept fourth overall, three seconds ahead of Fränk Schleck; he held that position in the final stage, equalling Robert Millar's highest ever finish by a British rider in the Tour. In October 2012, following the disqualification of Armstrong, who had originally placed third in the general classification, Wiggins was promoted to third place overall. This decision retroactively gave him the first podium finish by a British rider in Tour de France history.

In September Wiggins won the national time trial championship in Buckinghamshire, and in September at the road world championships in Mendrisio, Switzerland, was on course for a bronze medal in the time trial, until a mechanical problem and a delay getting a replacement bike ended with him finishing in 21st place. In October he ended the season by winning the Herald Sun Tour in Victoria, Australia, after helping teammates for most of the race. He led the race after winning the time trial on stage five in Geelong, beating second-placed teammate Svein Tuft by fourteen seconds.

Wiggins had been contracted to ride for Garmin Slipstream again in 2010, but it was announced on 10 December that he was to leave to join , having signed a four-year contract with the new British team.

2010: Move to Team Sky
Wiggins began 2010 as a team leader for the first time and his main target was to win the Tour de France.

In May Wiggins took his first Grand Tour victory on the wet streets of Amsterdam in the opening time trial of the Giro d'Italia, becoming the second Briton to wear the pink jersey after Cavendish in 2009. A series of crashes on the second stage put him 32 seconds behind in the general classification to the new leader Cadel Evans. Another crash on stage three cost him a further three minutes and 58 seconds. He recovered time on stage 11, finishing fourth, from a group of 56 riders, and lay tenth overall. He faded quickly towards the end of the race, however, losing time in the final stages. He came seventh in the  final time trial in Verona. Throughout the race he told the press he was saving himself for the Tour de France, when asked about his form, but in fact felt physically unfit.

Wiggins then went to a training camp in the Alps, testing the mountain stages used for the Tour; he struggled to find his fitness. He made a poor start in the Tour, taking 77th place in the prologue after an early starting position left him exposed to poor conditions. He finished eighth on stage three, as cobblestones troubled a number of favourites, but on stage eight at Morzine-Avoriaz, the first mountain summit finish of the Tour, he could only manage 19th place, losing one minute and 45-second to stage winner Andy Schleck. The following day he lost more time, coming 13th and losing four minutes and 55 seconds to the main contenders. He finished in 36th place on stage fourteen, falling to 18th overall, 11 minutes and 30 seconds behind race leader Andy Schleck; to the press he described his form as "consistently mediocre". On stage 19's time trial from Bordeaux to Pauillac, he finished in ninth place, three minutes and 33 seconds behind winner Cancellara. Wiggins finished the Tour in 24th place, 39 minutes and seven seconds down on winner Contador and seven places behind teammate Thomas Löfkvist. In February 2012, Contador was found guilty of doping and Wiggins's overall position was upgraded to 23rd.

He returned to racing in August, at the GP Ouest–France in Plouay. In September he retained his title at the national time trial championships, around the -long course in South Wales, before finishing the season at the Tour of Britain. His season ended at the Giro di Lombardia, where he was forced to abandon following a crash. Over the winter he trained with the Great Britain squad at Manchester Velodrome.

2011: Dauphiné and Vuelta
Wiggins was team leader of  again at the start of 2011. He opted not to enter the Giro d'Italia, concentrating instead on shorter events and the classics before undertaking altitude training to improve his climbing for the Tour de France. His season began at the Tour of Qatar in February, before winning the team pursuit at the Manchester round of the 2009–10 Track World Cup Classics, with a time of three minutes 55.438, the fifth-fastest time. He finished third overall, behind Martin and  rider Andreas Klöden. In April he rode Paris–Roubaix, and then the Tour de Romandie, finishing third in time trial on stage and helped lead-out teammate Ben Swift to victory on the final stage. In March he finished second in the time trial on the third stage of the Critérium International, four seconds down on Klöden. In May he won the -long time trial on stage four of the Bayern Rundfahrt, beating 's Cancellara by 33 seconds, and finished the event in 14th place overall, while also helping teammate Geraint Thomas to win the event.

He then went for altitude training in the Alps, in preparation for the Tour. He took the overall lead in the Critérium du Dauphiné after finishing second in the time trial on stage three. On the final three mountain stages, Wiggins maintained his lead over second-placed Evans to win the race, at that time his biggest victory on the road. In June Wiggins won the national road race championship in Northumberland.

After he had recovered from his injuries,  confirmed that Wiggins would ride in the Vuelta a España for the first time, as well as in the road world championships. Wiggins also confirmed that he would take part the Tour in 2012, even though the Olympics would follow soon after. The Vuelta and the world championships were seen as a dress rehearsal for 2012. He had a difficult start to the Vuelta, as  finished 42 seconds behind winners  in the opening team time trial in Benidorm, but a strong first week brought him back into contention, leaving him twentieth overall after stage eight. On stage nine, Wiggins and teammate Chris Froome attacked on the final climb to finish fourth and fifth respectively, gaining time on  rider Joaquim Rodríguez, Michele Scarponi and other contenders. Wiggins was expected to take the overall lead in the time trial on the following day, but Froome confounded expectations by finishing second on the stage, and Wiggins only rose to third overall. He eventually took the lead after the rest day. Stage fourteen saw Wiggins and Froome gaining on most of their rivals. However, Wiggins lost the lead to 's Juan José Cobo on stage fifteen, when he finished fifth on the climb up the Angliru and dropped to third in the standings, behind Froome, who was second. Wiggins finished the Vuelta in third place – his first podium finish in a Grand Tour.  In July 2019 Wiggins was retrospectively promoted to second place in the Vuelta after the UCI stripped Cobo of the win for an anti-doping violation.

In September he competed in the road world championships in Copenhagen, he won the silver medal in the  time trial, finishing one minute and fifteen seconds behind Germany's Martin, and four seconds ahead of reigning champion Cancellara (Switzerland) in third. Four days later, he was part of the Great Britain team that set up Cavendish's victory in the road race; Wiggins took over lead on the final lap of 17 around the  circuit, setting a high pace to chase down the breakaway and stop attacks from developing.

2012: Tour de France and Olympic gold
In 2012 Wiggins continued to focus on road racing. The individual pursuit was removed from the programme at the Olympics later in the year, and in December 2011 coach Rod Ellingworth told The Guardian, "The chances of him doing the team pursuit are really slim now". He began his 2012 season with third place in the Volta ao Algarve, including victory in the concluding time trial, edging out world champion Martin by less than a second.

In March Wiggins finished second in the opening time trial of the Paris–Nice, one second behind 's Gustav Larsson, who avoided the wet conditions, unlike Wiggins and the other favourites that set off later in the day. The following day he took the lead in the race after being part of a 30-man breakaway as the peloton split into echelons. He held the lead for the rest of the event, winning the final stage, a time-trial on the Col d'Èze, to win the race by eight seconds overall and become the first British rider to win the race since Tom Simpson in 1967. His final stage victory was also good enough to give him the points classification. Wiggins's time is the fastest time for the traditional time-trial on the Col d'Èze.

On the stage one of the Tour de Romandie in April, Wiggins took a rare sprint victory from a group of 59 riders. He lost the jersey to  rider Luis León Sánchez after Sánchez won two consecutive stages, but won the final time trial, despite suffering a dropped chain, to take the overall victory and become the first Briton to win the race in its 65-year history.

In June Wiggins competed in the Critérium du Dauphiné, and began the defence of his title with a second-place finish in the prologue, one second behind 's Luke Durbridge. He took the overall lead the following day, after Durbridge was dropped on one of the stage's six climbs. He held the lead to the end, eventually winning by over a minute, with teammate Rogers in second place.

Wiggins entered the Tour de France as one of the favourites to win it. He took over the yellow jersey by finishing third on stage seven, the first mountaintop finish, becoming the fifth British rider to wear the jersey, and first since David Millar in 2000. Wiggins won the time trial on stage nine. On stage ten, he and his team staved off an attack by Nibali on the descent of the Col du Grand Colombier, leading Nibali to accuse Wiggins of disrespecting him. Wiggins extended his lead on stage 11 after Froome helped him to bridge across to his rivals, who had attacked on the finishing climb to La Toussuire.

During stage fourteen, a mountain stage, a spectator threw carpet tacks onto the narrow road at the top of the Mur de Péguère climb. Several riders suffered punctures, including Evans, the defending champion, who lost approximately two minutes while his team repaired his bicycle. Wiggins and his fellow members of  emerged without a puncture. Believing that a puncture resulting from an unfortunate incident should not determine the fate of a competitor, Wiggins then had his teammates and the rest of the peloton slow down to allow Evans and other affected cyclists to catch up. It was perceived as a generous act of sportsmanship and Wiggins was called "Le Gentleman" as a result. On stage 16, Wiggins and Froome were able to follow attacks by Nibali on the final climb of the day and finished with the same time as the Italian. On stage 17, the final mountain stage, Froome and Wiggins finished together in second and third place respectively, with Nibali coming in 19 seconds later. Wiggins won the time trial on stage 19, giving him a lead of three minutes and 21 seconds at the start of the final stage. On that stage, Wiggins helped teammate Cavendish achieve his fourth consecutive victory on the Champs-Élysées and confirmed his own overall victory in the process. Wiggins became the first, and is currently the only person in history to win the Paris–Nice, the Tour de Romandie, the Critérium du Dauphiné and the Tour de France in a single season.

Wiggins was selected to participate in two road cycling events at the 2012 Summer Olympics in London – the time trial and the road race. Wiggins finished 103rd in the road race. Wiggins won gold in the time trial ahead of Martin of Germany and Froome of Britain. By doing so he became the most decorated British Olympian, with seven medals, surpassing the six won by Sir Steve Redgrave. This record was soon shared with Sir Chris Hoy, who also obtained his seventh Olympic medal in 2012. Wiggins entered the Guinness World Records, becoming the first cyclist to win an Olympic gold medal and the Tour de France in the same year. Wiggins's boyhood idol Miguel Induráin won five consecutive Tours between 1991 and 1995, and won a gold medal at the 1996 Olympics in Atlanta.

Wiggins returned to racing at the Tour of Britain in September, pulling out on the sixth stage with a stomach bug. The road race at the road world championships in Limburg, Netherlands, was his last of the season. In October he was awarded the prestigious Vélo d'Or trophy in recognition of his achievements in 2012. In November he was involved in a road accident and taken to hospital with suspected broken ribs, but was released next day with only minor injuries. In December he won the BBC Sports Personality of the Year Award with 492,064 (30.25%) of the votes cast. Wiggins was knighted in the 2013 New Years Honours for services to cycling, although he claimed he would use the title for 'comedy purposes', stating that he felt "a little bit inferior" to others receiving knighthoods saying "I've won a bike race, you know, and I feel a little bit inferior to everyone", saying "I was just talking to some of the other people getting stuff, and asking them what they've been honoured for, and they're historic things, ground-breaking sciences or whatever". He was among the nominees for the Laureus World Sports Award for Sportsman of the Year, with Jamaican athlete Usain Bolt taking the prize.

2013: Giro d'Italia and Tour of Britain

It was widely expected that Wiggins would ride to retain his Tour de France title in 2013. However, in February he asserted that his focus for the season would be the Giro d'Italia, after which he would ride the Tour de France in support of teammate Froome. In April he let it be known that he desired to win another Tour, and had hopes of achieving the Tour and Giro double – a feat that has not been achieved since Marco Pantani in 1998.

Wiggins participated in a winter training camp in Mallorca. His first race of the season was the Tour of Oman in February. On the first stage he was caught behind a crash, the time delay pushing him back to the back of the field. For the remainder of the race Wiggins helped Froome, who won the overall classification. Wiggins opted not to defend his title at the Paris–Nice, or ride the Tirreno–Adriatico, instead participating in a training camp on Mount Teide in Tenerife.

In April Wiggins rode the four-day Giro del Trentino in Northern Italy as preparation for the Giro d'Italia. The first day's race schedule consisted of a road race followed by a team time trial. An unexpected breakaway in the road race caused Wiggins to lose over six minutes. However he led the team to victory later in the day during the team time trial. On the fourth and final stage Wiggins suffered a mechanical problem at the foot of the final  climb. He ended up finishing the race in fifth place, one minute and 40 seconds down on winner Nibali.

Wiggins entered the Giro d'Italia as one of the favourites for the general classification.  won the stage two team time trial on the island of Ischia, covering the distance of  14 seconds quicker than Nibali's  squad. On stage four Wiggins lost 17 seconds after being delayed by a crash within the final , dropping him in the standings from second to sixth. Teammates Rigoberto Urán and Sergio Henao helped pace him back toward the leaders, but could not close the gap. Wiggins finished 90 seconds down on the race favourites, dropping him out of the race's top 20. A bike change compelled by a puncture cost Wiggins some time, and he ended up finishing the race ten seconds down on Dowsett. A group of teammates helped pace him back, and the gap was closed. Following stage 11 Wiggins revealed that he was suffering from a chest infection. He withdrew from the race the following day, after losing over three minutes on the day's stage.

The presence of a knee injury was disclosed to the public on 31 May, which forced Wiggins to forgo defending his title in the Tour de France. He subsequently suggested he may never ride the Tour again. He returned to racing at the Tour de Pologne, winning stage seven's  time trial, 56 seconds ahead of second placed Cancellara.

In September, Wiggins led  at his home race, the Tour of Britain. He won the time trial on stage three on roads around Knowsley Safari Park, close to his home in Lancashire. He held the lead for the rest of the week to win the race for the first time, and take his first stage race victory of the season. The following week at the world championships, he took the silver medal in the time trial, behind winner Tony Martin and ahead of Cancellara in a repeat of the 2011 podium. Wiggins was also selected to ride the road race, but abandoned after one lap, and was soon followed by the other British riders as none finished the race.

2014: World time trial champion and track return

Wiggins had stated that his main targets for 2014 were the Paris–Roubaix one day Classic, the Tour of California and the road world championships, as well as riding the Tour de France in support of Chris Froome.

Wiggins rode the Tour of Flanders as a replacement for the injured Ian Stannard, and finished 32nd, one minute 43 seconds behind the winner Fabian Cancellara, having helped Geraint Thomas on his way to eighth. Wiggins contested Paris–Roubaix for the first time since 2011, becoming the first former Tour de France winner to compete at the race since Greg LeMond in 1992, and secured ninth position, his only top ten finish in a monument as part of a group twenty seconds down on race winner Niki Terpstra.

At the Tour of California, Wiggins won the time trial on stage two by a margin of 40 seconds over second placed Rohan Dennis to move into the overall lead which he would keep for the rest of the race. Despite that good result, Wiggins was not selected by his team to be riding the Tour de France, prompting his return to the track cycling team as preparation for the Commonwealth Games in Glasgow.

At the Commonwealth Games in July, Wiggins participated in the 4000m team pursuit with Steven Burke, Ed Clancy and Andy Tennant, managing to win the silver medal. The following day Wiggins announced that he was "done with the road" and that he would likely never ride a grand tour again. He did not rule out some road events but wants to concentrate his training on preparation for the team pursuit at the 2016 Summer Olympics.

In September Wiggins rode the Tour of Britain, winning the final  time trial in London and ending the race in third overall behind the winner, 's Dylan van Baarle, and Michał Kwiatkowski. Wiggins then won gold in the time trial at the world road championships in Ponferrada, Spain, with a winning margin of 26 seconds over Tony Martin over the  course.

2015: Paris–Roubaix, WIGGINS and hour record

In January 2015 it was confirmed that Wiggins had signed a contract extension with Team Sky to the end of April 2015, with a focus on attempting to win Paris–Roubaix, before transferring to his newly founded  team in order to prepare alongside other members of the British track endurance squad for the team pursuit at the 2016 Summer Olympics. It was also confirmed that he would attempt to break the hour record in 2015. In March he confirmed that he would make his debut with his eponymous team at the inaugural Tour de Yorkshire at the start of May.

Early in the season, Wiggins rode the Tour of Qatar, in which he lost out on contention for the general classification after being caught out by a split in the peloton and then finished third in the race's individual time trial stage behind Cancellara and Niki Terpstra, his first opportunity to wear his rainbow skinsuit. Wiggins then took part in the traditional opening race of the classics season, Omloop Het Nieuwsblad, finishing 44th as his teammate Ian Stannard took victory.

Wiggins returned to Paris–Nice, a race he had won in 2012. The race opened and closed with time-trials; Wiggins finished 12th in the prologue, did not feature in the following five stages, often riding at the back of the peloton, and then withdrew before the traditional mountain time-trial up the Col d'Èze, a stage for which Wiggins holds the fastest ever time, a legacy of his 2012 victory there. Again, his teammate Richie Porte was victorious in the race.

Wiggins was set to ride E3 Harelbeke in March, a return to the cobbled classics in the lead up to his main objective of Paris–Roubaix, but withdrew. Instead he rode Gent–Wevelgem two days later; however, he abandoned the race, which was hit by severe weather conditions with much heavy wind and rain, and only 39 riders finished the race. During the mid-week Three Days of De Panne, which began on 31 March, Wiggins acted as a lead-out man of Sky's sprinter, Elia Viviani, and then convincingly won the final stage's short time trial, expected to be his last in Sky colours, which also gave him 3rd place overall in the race.

At Paris–Roubaix, Wiggins's much publicised last race with Sky and primary goal of the early season, he finished in 18th position. He attacked with  left to race, but was reabsorbed by the peloton. A few days after the race it was announced that Wiggins would make his bid to break the hour record on 7 June at Lee Valley VeloPark. He participated to the Tour de Yorkshire with WIGGINS Team, but did not register a significant result. A few weeks after leaving Team Sky, Wiggins said he felt "liberated" and "happier".

On 16 August, Wiggins joined Cavendish on the track for the first time since the 2008 Olympics, winning the Madison in the first round of the Revolution cycling series at the newly opened Derby Velodrome. In October Wiggins took his first gold medal at the European track championships when he was part of the British squad that won the team pursuit.

2016: Fifth Olympic gold and retirement

Wiggins competed at the world championships in London, where he took two medals: in the team pursuit, he was part of the British squad that qualified for the final, where they took the silver behind Australia despite leading with 500 metres to go and going on to set the fastest time in competition by a British quartet since 2012. However Wiggins said that he was happy with his performance, stating "that (was) the strongest I've been in a team pursuit, so there's a bit of life left in me yet, and I've got another four or five months to get a bit better". Subsequently, he raced with Cavendish in the madison, where they clinched their second world title in the discipline as a pairing using similar tactics to their 2008 win: accumulating points in the sprints in the early stages of the race, before making up a one lap deficit on their French, Colombian and Swiss rivals by working with the Spanish pairing of Sebastián Mora and Albert Torres in a breakaway, taking the lead and holding on for the win despite Cavendish crashing with 11 laps to go.

Through the spring of 2016 Wiggins focused on training for the Olympics, limiting his road racing to a small number of events, finishing low down the placings in all of them. As part of a five-man squad for the team pursuit, Wiggins was reported to be breaking world records in Olympic training, despite apparent disagreements between Wiggins and Cavendish, who was nominated as the squad's fifth rider in order to allow him to enter the omnium at the games. The team pursuit squad achieved the fastest time in qualification for the tournament, before reaching the final with a world record time in a victory against New Zealand. In the final, Great Britain defeated Australia to bring Wiggins his eighth Olympic medal, and his fifth gold. Subsequently, Wiggins announced his plan to retire after the Six Days of Ghent in November. He plans to expand his activities in supporting and running Team Wiggins, including an aim to create a women's team. In his penultimate racing event, the Six Days of London, Wiggins placed second overall with Cavendish, before the pair won his final event, the Six Days of Ghent. After the event, Wiggins confirmed that this had been his last race as a team with Cavendish, but that he may go back on his decision to retire, in the right circumstances. However, on 28 December 2016 he announced that he was retiring from professional cycling saying "2016 is the end of the road for this chapter, onwards and upwards, 'feet on the ground, head in the clouds' kids from Kilburn don't win Olympic Golds and Tour de Frances! They do now."

Controversy around therapeutic use exemptions
The leaking of his personal medical history by a group of hackers called the Fancy Bear, in September 2016, raised questions about Wiggins's use of therapeutic use exemptions (TUEs), which allow athletes with certified medical conditions to take banned substances so as to allow them to compete with healthy athletes.

The leaked files show that he received six TUEs during his career for substances which are otherwise banned by WADA. In 2008, he was granted TUEs for salbutamol (which has since been legalised), formoterol and budesonide to treat asthma. Wiggins later received three intramuscular injections of the drug triamcinolone, a powerful corticosteroid. Triamcinolone is a banned substance because it allows riders to lose weight while maintaining power. The injections were administered to treat hayfever shortly before the 2011 and 2012 Tour de France races, and the 2013 Giro d'Italia.

Dr. Jeroen Swart, the South Africa-based exercise physiologist who oversaw Chris Froome's independent physiological testing, has suggested that the 2012 injection of triamcinolone ahead of Wiggins's historic Tour de France victory may have been administered as a preventive measure, rather than to treat existing symptoms, even though it is not a first-line therapy.

Whilst the use of banned performance-enhancing substances under TUEs is permitted by the sporting authorities provided the exemption was granted in terms of the WADA rules, questions have been raised about the in-competition use of such drugs. Dr Jeroen Swart questioned the choice of medication, the timing of the injections, the presence of disgraced doctor Geert Leinders on Wiggins's team at the time, and the fact that Wiggins said in his 2012 autobiography My Time that he had only ever received injections for immunisations and some drips.

Prentice Steffen, who was team doctor at  when Wiggins rode for the team in 2009, said in a 2016 interview with the BBC that he was "surprised" that Wiggins was granted TUEs for the injection of triamcinolone immediately before three Grand Tours, that the decision by the team to apply for these TUEs was "questionable", and that he felt they should not have been granted. Wiggins has denied that Geert Leinders had any direct involvement in his taking of the TUE drugs.

Jiffy-bag scandal

UK Anti-Doping (UKAD), an independent body which is responsible for planning and implementing anti-doping programs in UK sport, began a 14-month investigation in 2016 into the contents of a Jiffy bag which was delivered to Team Sky at the 2011 Critérium du Dauphiné for Wiggin's use. In November 2017, it found that there was insufficient evidence to conclude that the jiffy bag had contained a banned substance. UKAD reached its conclusion because of insufficient and lost medical records within British Cycling and Team Sky.

The package was collected from British Cycling's office in Manchester by the British Cycling women's manager, Simon Cope, on the request of Shane Sutton – then the technical director for British Cycling. Cope carried the package on a flight to Geneva, after which he drove to meet Richard Freeman, the British Cycling doctor who administered the drug to Wiggins. Cope denied knowing what was in the package.

UKAD began its investigation in 2016 following a tip-off that the bag delivered to Wiggins contained the banned corticosteroid triamcinolone, which allows riders to lose weight while maintaining power. UKAD's investigation was hindered by Richard Freeman, the British Cycling doctor who administered the drug, being too ill to give evidence to the inquiry. Freeman had also failed to upload medical records as required, and later reported that his laptop had been stolen while on holiday. He had since resigned from British Cycling. The head of Ukad, Nicole Sapstead, had testified to Parliament that there were no records of British Cycling purchasing Fluimucil in the UK. She told the MPs that British Cycling had however purchased significant amounts of triamcinolone, a corticosteroid generally banned in sport, which Wiggins is known to have used in other cases under a TUE.

In December 2016 Sir Dave Brailsford, who ran British Cycling and Team Sky in 2011, informed the Digital, Culture, Media and Sport select committee that the package contained Fluimucil, a brand of legal decongestant, which can be bought at chemists in France without a prescription. Nigel Huddleston MP said it was "extraordinary" that a select committee was required for this simple fact to emerge, and he questioned "the transparency, communication and governance of UK cycling".

UK Anti-Doping closed its investigation into the package after being unable to find evidence that it contained a banned substance. It released a statement which said that its investigation had been hampered by the lack of availability of detailed medical records. Parts of the investigation remain open, as Ukad has not yet been able to establish why products containing testosterone were delivered to the national cycling centre.

Damian Collins MP, the chairman of the select committee, said that the decision was "not an exoneration of anyone", and that "If Sky and British Cycling had kept proper medical records, this could have been wrapped up a lot sooner. It is unacceptable. A cloud now hangs over one of our greatest Olympians."

Wiggins has always denied any wrongdoing on his part, and has described the investigation as a "malicious witch-hunt".

The Digital, Culture, Media and Sport Committee made two major findings against Wiggins in a report released in March 2018. The committee believed Team Sky used the drug triamcinolone to "enhance the performances of riders and not just to treat medical need". The committee noted that there is no written evidence to substantiate a claim by Team Sky boss David Brailsford that the "jiffy-bag" contained Fluimucil. The committee stated that Team Sky doctor Richard Freeman, who had originally failed to record Wiggins's use of medical products, could no longer confirm that the contents of the bag were Fluimucil. It also noted that Freeman was "the only reported source of this information."

Report of the House of Commons Committee for Digital, Culture, Media and Sport
On 5 March 2018, the British House of Commons Digital, Culture, Media and Sport Committee published their report called "Combatting doping in sport". Their inquiry spanned the work of two committees, and started in August 2015. Among other things, the committee looked into doping in cycling, in response to the Fancy Bear hacking into the database of WADA and their publication of Therapeutic Use Exemption certificates (TUEs) issued to Bradley Wiggins in 2011, 2012 and 2013. They specifically inquired into the medication used at that time by Wiggins and Team Sky. In their conclusions, in paragraph 110, they state as follows:

The committee noted in its report that there is no written evidence to substantiate a claim by Team Sky boss David Brailsford that the "jiffy-bag" couriered to Team Sky at the 2011 Critérium du Dauphiné for Wiggins's use contained Fluimucil, a legal decongestant used for clearing mucus. The committee now says that Team Sky doctor Richard Freeman, who had failed to properly record Wiggins's use of medical products, can no longer confirm it was in fact Fluimucil. They also noted that Freeman was "the only reported source of this information."

The BBC called the report "A devastating blow to the reputations of some of the biggest names in British sport", and The Irish Times reported that Wiggins's Tour de France win is now in question. The Guardian wrote that: "It is only three months since we were last asking whether the latest crisis would signal the end for Team Sky. Now here we are again, wondering how much longer this organisation can continue when every scintilla of credibility they had as a completely clean team has been decimated by another inquiry."

Wiggins and Team Sky have continued to deny that any drugs were used without medical need.

Personal life

Family
Wiggins was married to Catherine (née Cockran), whom he met during the 2002 Commonwealth Games, after first meeting as juniors in 1997; they have three children together, Ben, Rebekah and Isabella. In May 2020, it was announced that Wiggins and his wife had separated.

Wiggins endured a difficult relationship with his father Gary Wiggins, who made no effort to contact Bradley for 14 years, since leaving the family when Bradley was two years old. Bradley only knew his father had been a professional cyclist. Their first meeting was in 1999, when Bradley was at a training camp in Australia; also meeting his two half-sisters from relationships his father had in Australia before and after the one with his mother. They next met the following year, when Bradley was back in Australia training and had gone out three weeks in advance to stay with Gary. Bradley quickly became disillusioned at his father's alcohol and drug problems, and they never met again. Gary Wiggins died in Aberdeen, New South Wales in 2008, aged 55.  Bradley did not attend the funeral.

Interests

He is a well-known mod and owns a collection of classic motor scooters and guitars from the 1960s and 1970s. He is a keen musician and guitarist and in December 2012 he made a surprise appearance at a Paul Weller charity concert, playing guitar on "That's Entertainment"; and together recorded a special for BBC Radio 6 Music discussing their love of music and mod culture, broadcast on Boxing Day. He supports Liverpool Football Club and Wigan Warriors rugby league club, and in 2012 the latter gave him a life membership, which he described as his highlight of the year. Wiggins presented the winner of the European Super League's 2012 Man of Steel Award to the Warriors player Sam Tomkins.

In July 2012 it was announced that Wiggins would collaborate with the Fred Perry clothing label "to develop an authentic, non-technical range of cycle wear". The clothing range, known as the Bradley Wiggins X Fred Perry Collaboration, was launched in July 2012 under a six-year contract.

In 2012 Wiggins launched the Bradley Wiggins Foundation to draw people into sport and regular exercise. The foundation backed the professional women's team , which launched for the 2013 season. However, in February 2015 Wiggins announced that the Foundation would be wound down in the run-up to the 2016 Olympics.

On 10 May 2015, Wiggins was interviewed by Kirsty Young as guest castaway on BBC Radio 4's Desert Island Discs; his favourite musical piece was "Sound and Vision" by David Bowie, his book choice was Slaying the Dragon: How to Turn Your Small Steps to Great Feats by Michael Johnson and his luxury item was a family photo album.

Wiggins served as guest editor of Radio 4's The Today Programme on 29 December 2015: as part of this he interviewed Paul Smith about fashion, Gary Lineker about making the transition from being a sportsman to working in the media, and discussed cycling with Jeremy Corbyn and Steve Hilton.

In 2019, in The Times, he revealed himself to be a fan of Only Fools And Horses and Chas and Dave, but "not really a reader" nor a lover of art or theatre.

In August 2019, Wiggins announced his intention to become a social worker after enrolling for a degree at an open university. He said that his upbringing, in Kilburn, London, gave him a "mental toughness" that would be helpful in supporting others. He also said that he doesn't "give a shit" about his cycling career and that he is "detached from it".

Other

Wiggins speaks fluent French through his participation with French cycling teams and after living in France for a number of years.

In a period after the 2004 Olympics, Wiggins started to drink heavily as he struggled to cope with his newfound fame. He stopped when his son Ben was born. "We had a baby. So then it was a case of, 'well, I've got to earn some fucking money' and the responsibility takes over", he explained.

At the 2012 Olympics, Wiggins rang the Olympic Bell to mark the start of the opening ceremony inside the Olympic Stadium.

Wiggins has written a number of books about his career. The first, entitled In Pursuit of Glory, was published in 2008 and covers his success as a track cyclist up to the Beijing Olympics. It was updated in 2009 to include his 2009 Tour de France fourth place (later updated to third). On Tour was published in 2010 and covers that year's Tour de France. Following his success at the 2012 Tour de France he published The Bradley Wiggins Opus. That same year he also published My Time which largely deals with the 2012 Tour de France and Olympics. My Story was published in 2013 and is an edited version of My Time for younger readers. In 2015 he added My Hour which tells of his successful attempt at the Hour record. In 2018 he added a seventh book, Icons, which details some of the riders who inspired him.

Wiggins's power output has been measured to be over 450 watts at anaerobic threshold.

In March 2014 Wiggins made an appearance as himself in an episode of BBC Radio 4's soap opera The Archers as part of the Sport Relief charitable appeal. Two years later he appeared in a comedy sketch filmed at the London Olympic Velodrome with Michael Crawford on Sport Relief 2016 where Crawford reprised his Some Mothers Do 'Ave 'Em character Frank Spencer.

A sculpture dedicated to and inspired by Wiggins was unveiled in 2014 at St Augustine's CE High School, his former school.

On 5 January 2017 it was announced that Wiggins would be a contestant on the Channel 4 winter sports reality television programme The Jump. However he was forced to withdraw from the show during the second week when he fractured his leg during training.

In June 2017 Wiggins revealed that he had taken up rowing on a serious basis after initially using it as a means to keep fit, with fellow Olympic champion James Cracknell as his coach. He stated that he was planning to compete in the British Indoor Rowing Championships in December of the same year with a view to competing at the 2020 Summer Olympics. He competed in the elite 2000m at the Championships, finishing 21st in a time of 6:22.5 after a slow start due to mistakenly believing that the race had false started.

In 2018 Wiggins launched The Bradley Wiggins Show, a cycle racing podcast produced in association with Eurosport, for a series of four episodes covering that year's Tour de France. The series received over a million downloads, and the show was renewed for a 20-episode run the following year, featuring discussion of the spring classics, Grand Tours and Road World Championships. He also took up punditry work for the channel in 2019, providing studio-based analysis for the Giro d'Italia before acting as a motorbike-mounted reporter for the Tour de France.

In July 2019 Comedy Central announced that they had approved the production of five episodes of Gods of the Game, a half-hour gameshow to be hosted by Wiggins featuring members of the public competing against elite sportspeople, including Mo Farah, Chris Hoy, Rebecca Adlington, Nicola Adams and Tim Henman, in "comedy versions" of their sports. Wiggins co-presented the programme with Tom Rosenthal. In a review of the show, Stuart Heritage of The Guardian wrote that "Gods of the Game is shooting for high-concept absurdity, but for the most part it falls short and only manages to be slightly diverting".

Wiggins said in an interview with Men's Health in 2022 that he had been groomed sexually by a cycling coach when he was 13. He said that he could not tell his stepfather about the abuse, because his stepfather was violent towards him.

Career achievements

Major results

Sources:

Road

2000
 7th Overall Circuit des Mines
2001
 1st  Overall Cinturón a Mallorca
1st Stages 1 (ITT) & 2
 1st  Overall Flèche du Sud
1st Stage 1
 3rd Overall International Tour of Rhodes
 9th Lincoln International GP 
 10th Overall Circuit des Mines
2003
 1st Stage 1 (ITT) Tour de l'Avenir
 5th Overall Tour du Poitou-Charentes
2005
 1st Stage 8 Tour de l'Avenir
 4th Overall Circuit de Lorraine
1st Stage 2 (ITT)
 7th Time trial, UCI World Championships
 7th LuK Challenge Chrono (with Christophe Moreau) 
2007
 1st Duo Normand (with Michiel Elijzen)
 1st Prologue Critérium du Dauphiné Libéré
 1st Stage 1 (ITT) Four Days of Dunkirk
 1st Stage 4 (ITT) Tour du Poitou-Charentes
 10th Time trial, UCI World Championships
  Combativity award Stage 6 Tour de France
2009
 1st  Time trial, National Championships
 1st  Overall Herald Sun Tour
1st Stage 5 (ITT)
 1st Beaumont Trophy
 1st Stage 3b (ITT) Three Days of De Panne
 1st Stage 1 (TTT) Tour of Qatar
 3rd Overall Tour de France
2010
 1st  Time trial, National Championships
 Giro d'Italia
1st Stage 1 (ITT)
Held  after Stage 1
 1st Stage 1 (TTT) Tour of Qatar
 3rd Overall Vuelta a Murcia
2011
 1st  Road race, National Championships (Beaumont Trophy)
 1st  Overall Critérium du Dauphiné
 1st Stage 4 (ITT) Bayern Rundfahrt
 2nd  Time trial, UCI World Championships
 2nd Overall Vuelta a España
Held  after Stages 11–15
 3rd Overall Paris–Nice
 9th UCI World Tour
2012
 1st  Time trial, Olympic Games
 1st  Overall Tour de France
1st Stages 9 (ITT) & 19 (ITT)
 1st  Overall Paris–Nice
1st  Points classification
1st Stage 8 (ITT)
 1st  Overall Tour de Romandie
1st Stages 1 & 5 (ITT)
 1st  Overall Critérium du Dauphiné
1st Stage 4 (ITT)
 2nd UCI World Tour
 3rd Overall Volta ao Algarve
1st Stage 5 (ITT)
2013
 1st  Overall Tour of Britain
1st Stage 3 (ITT)
 1st Stage 7 (ITT) Tour de Pologne
 1st Stage 2 (TTT) Giro d'Italia
 2nd  Time trial, UCI World Championships
 5th Overall Giro del Trentino
1st Stage 1b (TTT)
 5th Overall Volta a Catalunya
2014
 1st  Time trial, UCI World Championships
 1st  Time trial, National Championships
 1st  Overall Tour of California
1st Stage 2 (ITT)
 3rd Overall Tour of Britain
1st Stage 8a (ITT)
 9th Paris–Roubaix
2015
 3rd Overall Three Days of De Panne
1st Stage 3b (ITT)

General classification results timeline
Sources:

Monuments results timeline

Track

1998
 1st  Individual pursuit, UCI World Junior Championships
 National Junior Championships
1st  Points
1st  Scratch
 2nd  Team pursuit, Commonwealth Games
1999
 1st  Madison (with Rob Hayles), National Championships
2000
 2nd  Team pursuit, UCI World Championships
 3rd  Team pursuit, Olympic Games
 3rd Six Days of Grenoble (with Rob Hayles)
2001
 1st  Individual pursuit, UEC European Under-23 Championships
 2nd  Team pursuit, UCI World Championships
2002
 Commonwealth Games
2nd  Individual pursuit
2nd  Team pursuit
 2nd Six Days of Ghent (with Matthew Gilmore)
 3rd  Team pursuit, UCI World Championships
2003
 UCI World Championships
1st  Individual pursuit
2nd  Team pursuit
 1st Six Days of Ghent (with Matthew Gilmore)
2004
 Olympic Games
1st  Individual pursuit
2nd  Team pursuit
3rd  Madison (with Rob Hayles)
2007 
 UCI World Championships
1st  Individual pursuit
1st  Team pursuit
 UCI World Cup Classics
1st Individual pursuit, Manchester
1st Team pursuit, Manchester
1st Team pursuit, Sydney
1st Individual pursuit, Beijing
2nd Madison (with Mark Cavendish), Beijing
2008
 Olympic Games
1st  Individual pursuit
1st  Team pursuit
 UCI World Championships
1st  Individual pursuit
1st  Team pursuit
1st  Madison (with Mark Cavendish)
2011
 1st Team pursuit, UCI World Cup Classics, Manchester
2014
 2nd  Team pursuit, Commonwealth Games
2015
 Hour record: 54.526 km
 1st  Team pursuit, UEC European Championships
 Revolution Series, Derby
1st Team pursuit
1st Madison (with Mark Cavendish)
2016
 1st  Team pursuit, Olympic Games
 UCI World Championships
1st  Madison (with Mark Cavendish)
2nd  Team pursuit
 1st Six Days of Ghent (with Mark Cavendish)
 2nd Six Days of London (with Mark Cavendish)

Major championships results timeline
Sources:

World records

Awards and honours
 Cycling Weekly Cyclist of the Year: 2000
 Officer of the Order of the British Empire: 2005
 Commander of the Order of the British Empire: 2009
 London Youth Games Hall of Fame: 2010
 GQ Lifetime Achievement: 2012
 Vélo d'Or: 2012
 Sports Journalists' Association's Sportsman of the Year: 2012
 Cyclingnews.com Rider of the Year: 2012
 International Flandrien of the Year: 2012
 Bidlake Memorial Prize: 2012
 BBC Sports Personality of the Year: 2012
 Laureus World Sports Sportsman of the Year Award (nominated): 2013
 Knight Bachelor: 2013

See also

 2012 Summer Olympics and Paralympics gold post boxes
 List of British cyclists
 List of British cyclists who have led the Tour de France general classification
 List of Grand Tour general classification winners
 List of multiple Olympic gold medalists at a single Games
 List of multiple Olympic gold medalists
 List of multiple Summer Olympic medalists
 List of Olympic medalists in cycling (men)
 List of people from Ghent
 List of sporting knights and dames
 World record progression track cycling – Men's team pursuit
 Yellow jersey statistics

References

Sources

Further reading

External links

 
 
 
 

1980 births
British Tour de France stage winners
Commanders of the Order of the British Empire
Commonwealth Games silver medallists for England
Cyclists at the 1998 Commonwealth Games
Cyclists at the 2002 Commonwealth Games
Cyclists at the 2000 Summer Olympics
Cyclists at the 2004 Summer Olympics
Cyclists at the 2008 Summer Olympics
Cyclists at the 2012 Summer Olympics
Cyclists at the 2016 Summer Olympics
English male cyclists
English Olympic medallists
English people of Australian descent
British male cyclists
British Giro d'Italia stage winners
Living people
Olympic cyclists of Great Britain
Olympic gold medallists for Great Britain
Olympic silver medallists for Great Britain
Olympic bronze medallists for Great Britain
Olympic medalists in cycling
Medalists at the 2000 Summer Olympics
Medalists at the 2004 Summer Olympics
Medalists at the 2008 Summer Olympics
Medalists at the 2012 Summer Olympics
Medalists at the 2016 Summer Olympics
Sportspeople from Ghent
People from Eccleston, Lancashire
People from Maida Vale
Tour de France winners
UCI Road World Champions (elite men)
BBC Sports Personality of the Year winners
Knights Bachelor
People educated at St Augustine's Church of England High School
People in sports awarded knighthoods
British cycling road race champions
English knights
Cyclists at the 2014 Commonwealth Games
2012 Tour de France stage winners
UCI Track Cycling World Champions (men)
Commonwealth Games medallists in cycling
English track cyclists
Cyclists from East Flanders
Medallists at the 1998 Commonwealth Games
Medallists at the 2002 Commonwealth Games
Medallists at the 2014 Commonwealth Games